Marie-France Pagnier-Dunavan (born circa 1945) is a French diplomat. She is the Ambassador of France to Sri Lanka,  and the Maldives

Life 
She graduated from the Sciences Po, and Institut national des langues et civilisations orientales.

She was deputy consul general to Los Angeles.  She was a member of the Permanent Mission of France to the Organization of American States. From 1989 to 1991, she was Deputy Director of Central and Eastern Africa. From 1989 to 1991, she was Minister-Counsellor to Morocco. She was embassy adviser in Sweden,. From 1998 to 2000, she was Deputy Director for Asia-Oceania. She was ambassador to Cuba.

References 

1945 births
Ambassadors of France to Sri Lanka
French women ambassadors
Sciences Po alumni
Ambassadors to the Maldives
Living people